MV Esperanza was a ship operated by Greenpeace.  Previous to being a Greenpeace ship it was a fire-fighting vessel owned by the Soviet Navy, built in 1984. It was recommissioned in 2000 and relaunched in 2002 after being named Esperanza ('hope' in Spanish) by visitors to the Greenpeace website. It had undergone a major refit by Greenpeace to make it more environmentally friendly. A new helicopter deck and boat cranes were also added. The ship was powered by two Sulzer V12 marine diesel engines.

The ship had a heavy ice class, giving it the ability to work in polar regions. This made it the fastest and largest of the Greenpeace fleet.

Original painted in blue livery, during December 2014 it called at Palumbo Malta Superyachts for repairs and a new livery, acquiring a green hull like other Greenpeace vessels.

Esperanza has been involved in many world wide campaigns, protecting environment and wildlife. She was decommissioned and sold for scrap in 2022.

Video equipment aboard
Greenpeace added live webcams to the Esperanza in 2006. The webcams are positioned on the bow of the ship, the mast and the bridge, they send a new image every minute to their Defending Our Oceans website and provide an archive of action.

Operational career

The Esperanza participated in fishery patrols with Kiribati and the Marshall Islands in 2006.  In January 2017, the ship launched an ROV off the Atlantic Coast of Brazil to help document the largely unknown Amazon Reef in advance of planned developments by oil companies.

In 2020 the Esperanza sailed the Protect the Oceans campaign, a voyage from the Arctic to the Antarctic. This almost year-long voyage was one of Greenpeace’s biggest ever expeditions and highlighted the many threats the oceans are facing. 

With Greenpeace’s vision for a zero-carbon future, it was decided to retire the Esperanza. Early 2022 she was decommissioned and sold for scrap to Spain. Her last voyage she sailed 7 February 2022 from her homeport Amsterdam to Bilbao. Then from Bilbao to Gijón where she arrived 12 February 2022, to be dismantled and recycled.

See also
 
 
  (Flagship of the Sea Shepherd Conservation Society)

Gallery

References

External links

 Greenpeace's Esperanza page
 live webcam aboard Greenpeace's boats, including the Esperanza
 narrated virtual tour of the ship

1984 ships
Ships built in Gdańsk
Ships of Greenpeace
Auxiliary ships of the Soviet Navy